Jordi Hurtado Torres (Sant Feliu de Llobregat, Barcelona, 16 June 1957) is a Spanish radio and television presenter and voice actor. He is popular in Spain thanks to Televisión Española shows like Saber y ganar (To Know and To Win).

As of 2023 he has been the host of Saber y ganar for 25 years.

Radio

Television

Trivia
The fact that he has been for so long on television without having aged significantly has given rise to all sorts of jokes and memes about him being immortal, a robot, a hologram or even a Zombie as seen in Fox TV ad for The Walking Dead (TV series)

References

External links 
 Dubbing works
 

1957 births
Living people
Spanish television presenters
People from Sant Feliu de Llobregat